Mike Bukta (born June 1, 1967) is a Canadian former ice hockey player who played two seasons in the ECHL for the Nashville Knights.

Career statistics

References

External links

1967 births
Living people
Canadian ice hockey defencemen
Calgary Wranglers (WHL) players
Seattle Breakers players
Seattle Thunderbirds players
Saskatoon Blades players
Nashville Knights players
Ice hockey people from Calgary